The  was a battle between pro-Imperial and Tokugawa shogunate forces during the Boshin War in Japan. The battle followed the Battle of Toba–Fushimi on 29 March 1868 (Gregorian calendar).

Prelude

After defeating the forces of the Tokugawa shogunate at the Battle of Toba–Fushimi, the Imperial forces (consisting of the feudal armies of Chōshū, Satsuma and Tosa domains) split into three columns, which progressed northeast towards the Tokugawa capital of Edo up each of the three main highways: Tōkaidō (road), Nakasendō and Hokurikudō.

Meanwhile, Kondō Isami, leader of the Shinsengumi, withdrew to Edo after the Battle of Toba–Fushimi. Once back in Edo, he met with Shogunal military commander Katsu Kaishū.

The battle
The Imperial army reached the Tokugawa stronghold of Kōfu first, and occupied it with a struggle. The Imperial army then met the Shogunal forces in battle at Katsunuma (now a part of Kōshū, Yamanashi) on 29 March. Outnumbered 10:1, the Shogunal forces were defeated with 179 casualties. The survivors, including Kondō, attempted to flee to Aizu via Sagami Province, which was still controlled by Tokugawa hatamoto loyalists.

Consequences
Kondō Isami narrowly escaped from this battle, but was captured soon after at Nagareyama, Chiba. He was beheaded by the new government at Itabashi a short time later. The Battle of Kōshū-Katsunuma was the last significant military action in central Honshū during the Boshin War, and the death of Kondō Isami further demoralized Tokugawa supporters, contributing to the surrender of Edo Castle without bloodshed later that year.

Further reading
Aikawa Tsukasa and Kikuchi Akira. Shinsengumi Jitsuroku. Tōkyō: Chikuma-Shōbō, 1996.
Kikuchi Akira. Shinsengumi Hyakuichi no Nazo. Tōkyō: Shin Jinbutsu Ōraisha, 2000.
Nagakura Shinpachi. Shinsengumi Tenmatsu-ki. Tōkyō: Shin Jinbutsu Ōraisha, 2003
Shinsengumi Saitō Hajime no Nazo. Tōkyō: Shin Jinbutsu Ōraisha, 2003.
Yamakawa Kenjirō. Aizu Boshin Senshi. Tōkyō: Tōkyō Daigaku Shuppankai, 1931.

Battles involving Japan
1868 in Japan
Battles of the Boshin War
Conflicts in 1868
History of Yamanashi Prefecture
March 1868 events